František Tázler (born 1898, date of death unknown) was a Czech wrestler. He competed at the 1920 and the 1924 Summer Olympics.

References

External links
 

1898 births
Year of death missing
Olympic wrestlers of Czechoslovakia
Wrestlers at the 1920 Summer Olympics
Wrestlers at the 1924 Summer Olympics
Czech male sport wrestlers
Place of birth missing